Rebecca Artis (born 21 November 1988) is an Australian professional golfer who plays on the Ladies European Tour.

Professional career
Artis turned professional in 2010 having played in the 2009 Ricoh Women's British Open as an amateur. 

Artis has played on the Ladies European Tour since turning professional and won her first professional event at the 2013 Helsingborg Open in Sweden.

Her second professional win came at the 2015 Ladies Scottish Open at Dundonald Links in 2015, Artis shot a final round 66 to win by two strokes, having trailed Suzann Pettersen by 6 strokes going into the final round.

Artis earned her 2018 LPGA Tour card through qualifying school.

Professional wins (2)

Ladies European Tour wins (2)

Results in LPGA majors
Results not in chronological order before 2018.

^ The Evian Championship was added as a major in 2013 

CUT = missed the half-way cut
"T" = tied

Team appearances
Professional
International Crown (representing Australia): 2016

References

External links

Australian female golfers
Ladies European Tour golfers
LPGA Tour golfers
Sportswomen from New South Wales
1988 births
Living people
21st-century Australian women